Vitaliy Ivanovych Bunechko (born 6 August 1973) is a Ukrainian civil servant and politician. He is the current Governor of Zhytomyr Oblast.

Biography 
In 1995, he graduated from the Lutsk Pedagogical Institute. In 1997, he graduated from the Security Service Academy. Bunechko is a Candidate of Law Sciences.

From 1995 to 1996, he worked as a history teacher. From 1996 to 2018, Bunechko worked at the Security Service of Ukraine. He served in Mariupol (Donetsk Oblast).

Since 2019 he is Governor of Zhytomyr Oblast.

Awards 
 Order of Bohdan Khmelnytsky, 3rd class (2022).

References

External links 
 
 

1973 births
Living people
People from Rivne Oblast
Lutsk Pedagogical Institute alumni
Recipients of the Order of Bohdan Khmelnytsky, 3rd class
Security Service of Ukraine officers
Ukrainian civil servants
Governors of Zhytomyr Oblast
Independent politicians in Ukraine
21st-century Ukrainian politicians